The 2017 African Wrestling Championships was held in Marrakesh, Morocco from 28 to 30 April 2017.

Medal table

Team ranking

Medal summary

Men's freestyle

Men's Greco-Roman

Women's freestyle

Doping cases

 Zohier Iftene from Algeria who won men's freestyle 65 kg event, tested positive for Stanozolol after the competition.

References 

Africa
International sports competitions hosted by Morocco
April 2017 sports events in Africa